Mary Wolf may refer to:

 Mary B. Wolf, mayor of Williamsport, Pennsylvania, United States
 Mary Hunter Wolf (died 2000), American theater director and producer